Papadimitriou or Papademetriou is a Greek surname that may refer to:

 Babis Papadimitriou (born 1954), Greek journalist, news analyst, economist and commentator
Nicholas Papademetriou, Australian actor of Greek Cypriot descent
 Lisa Papademetriou (born 1971), American author of young adult fiction
 Alexandros Papadimitriou (born 1973), Greek Olympic hammer thrower
 Christos Papadimitriou (born 1949), Greek computer scientist
 Dimitri B. Papadimitriou (born 1946), Greek economist
 Justin Peter Papadimitriou (born 1977), Canadian drummer
 Lefteris Papadimitriou, Greek composer
 Thodoros Papadimitriou (1931–2018), Greek sculptor

Surnames
Greek-language surnames
Surnames of Greek origin